Christian Floriano "Tating" Pasilan Jr., is a Filipino footballer who plays as a striker and currently the team captain of Green Archers United in the United Football League. He is also a member of the Philippine national football team and a current coach of De La Salle Zobel grade school football team.

International career
In 2008, he earned his full international caps in the AFC Challenge Cup qualifiers in Iloilo and the ASEAN Football Federation qualifiers in Cambodia. In January and February 2013, he was one of the players called up for Philippine national football team training in preparation for 2014 AFC Challenge Cup Qualifiers to be held in Manila, Philippines.

References

Living people
1986 births
Filipino footballers
Philippines international footballers
People from San Carlos, Negros Occidental
Footballers from Negros Occidental
Green Archers United F.C. players
Kaya F.C. players
Association football forwards
University of St. La Salle alumni
University Athletic Association of the Philippines footballers
Visayan people